John Reinhart "Jack, Jackie" Schmidt (November 11, 1924 – November 15, 2004) was a professional ice hockey player who played 45 games in the National Hockey League with the Boston Bruins during the 1942–43 season. The rest of his career, which lasted from 1942 to 1953, was spent in the minor leagues. He also served in World War II. Jack is the brother of Joe Schmidt.

Schmidt scored his first NHL goal on November 22, 1942 in Boston's 7-6 victory over the Toronto Maple Leafs.

Career statistics

Regular season and playoffs

References

External links
 

1924 births
2004 deaths
Boston Bruins players
Canadian expatriates in the United States
Canadian ice hockey left wingers
Ice hockey people from Saskatchewan
New Westminster Royals (WHL) players
Providence Reds players
Valleyfield Braves players